The Dassault MD 315 Flamant is a French light twin-engined transport airplane built shortly after World War II by Dassault Aviation for the French Air Force.

Design and development
Design work on a twin-engined light transport started in 1946 with the MD 303, a development of an earlier project for an eight-seat communications aircraft, the Marcel Bloch MB-30. The prototype MD 303 first flew on 26 February 1947 powered by two Béarn 6D engines, designed to meet a French Air Force requirement for a colonial communications aircraft. A re-engined version was ordered into production at the new Dassault factory at Bordeaux-Mérignac. The production aircraft was a low-wing monoplane with twin tail surfaces and a tricycle undercarriage, powered by two Renault 12S piston engines.

Three main versions of the aircraft now named Flamant (Flamingo in French) were produced. The MD 315 ten-seat colonial communication aircraft (first flown on 6 July 1947), the MD 312 six-seat transport aircraft (first flown on 27 April 1950), and the MD 311 navigation trainer (first flown on 23 March 1948). The MD 311 had a distinctive glazed nose for its role as both a bombing and navigation trainer.

Operational history

The first Flamant was delivered to the French Air Force in 1949 and deliveries of all versions were completed by 1953

The aircraft was used for pilot training, navigation training, light transport, maritime surveillance and light ground attack. During the Algerian War of Independence the plane was used for light attack with the Nord SS.11 and AS.11 antitank missiles or with machine guns, bombs, and rockets. The Flamant MD 311s (which were based in Algeria to train pilots and navigators at first) were the first aircraft in history to fire one of the world's first wire-guided antitank missiles in anger, using French Army SS.11 antitank missiles, in a combat experiment to get at fortified caves located in deep mountain gorges, in 1956 from an aircraft based with the special unit of the French Air Force in Algeria, GOM.86.  The SS.11 attacks proved extremely successful and the French Army which had provided the missiles, began an experiment which resulted in the world's first attack helicopters firing antitank missiles.  The Flamant stayed in service until 1981. In addition to the French air force, the Flamant served in Cambodia, Madagascar, Tunisia, and Vietnam.

Variants
MB 30-1Original proposals for a bombing and navigation trainer.
MB 30-2Original proposals for a  medical and colonial roles.
MB 30-3Original proposals for a liaison and training aircraft.
MD 303
Prototype, one built, powered by two  Béarn 6D engines.
MD 311
Bombing, navigation and photography training aircraft, 41 built (1 prototype + 40 production), powered by two  SNECMA 12S engines.
MD 312 Multi-engine pilot trainer and six-seat transport and communications aircraft, 118 built, powered by two  SNECMA 12S engines.
MD 312M Utility aircraft for French Navy. 25 built.
MD 312BExperimental version with a single fin, rectangular fuselage windows, and a heavier loaded weight. One built, powered by two  SNECMA 12S engines. Used later for Mirage IV radar development.
MD 315Ten-seat utility transport aircraft, 137 built, powered by two  SNECMA 12S engines.
MD 316TOne prototype fitted with a single-finned tail, and two  Wright R-1300-CB7A1 Cyclone radial piston engines.
MD 316XOne MD 315 aircraft fitted with two  SNECMA 14X Super Mars radial piston engines.

Operators

 Cambodian Air Force (MD 315)

 Cameroon Air Force (MD 315)

 French Air Force (MD 315, MD 312, MD 311)
 French Navy (MD 312)

 Khmer Air Force

 Madagascar Aeronaval Force (MD 315, MD 312)

 Niger Air Force (one MD 312 received in the 1960s)

 Republic of Vietnam Air Force (MD 312, MD 315)

 Tunisian Air Force (MD 312)

Specifications (MD 315)

See also

Citations

Bibliography

 Bridgman, Leonard (ed.) Jane's All The World's Aircraft 1953–54. London:Jane's, 1953.

 Francillon, René J. "Flamant  — Dassault's Workhorse". Air Enthusiast, 49, March to May 1993. pp. 48–59.

Flamant
1940s French military transport aircraft
Aircraft first flown in 1947
Mid-wing aircraft
Twin piston-engined tractor aircraft